Uboa is the musical project of the Australian drone, ambient and noise rock artist Xandra Metcalfe. She began in 2010 during a period when Metcalfe experimented with doom metal textures and home studio equipment, and gradually moved towards noise, experimental and abstract compositions.

Uboa's debut album Sometimes Light was released in 2010, followed by Jouissance in 2013 and The Sky May Be in 2018. Her 2019 follow up album, The Origin of My Depression has been critically acclaimed.

Xandra has collaborated as Uboa with several other noise artists including Slumber Kitty, Muddy Lawrence, Solus Varak and has produced a split EP with Bolt Gun. Jenny Hval, Planning for Burial, the English producer and composer Geoff Barrow, and producer Ben Salisbury's collaborative score for the 2018 film Annihilation have been cited as influences.

History
Xandra lives in Melbourne, Australia. Uboa's music often reflects her struggles with her transgender identity, reflected in her music via the juxtaposition of emotional ambient music and harsh white noise. In an April 2019 interview she described the sources of her mental pain as including "mistaken identity, failed relationships and inability to love, joblessness, boredom, structurelessness, psychosis...[and] anxiety."

In February 2023, Uboa signed to The Flenser, which released The Origin of My Depression on vinyl for the first time.

Music
In a very positive review of The Origin of My Depression by the critic Anthony Fantano, her sound was described as a "cerebral dive" into Xandra's most negative and intense feelings of being a transgender woman...via "intense feelings of abandonment...expressed through intense soundscapes...and walls of distortion", culminating in a wide expanse of styles and soundscapes. Metcalfe has said of the album's sound, "I always associated sadness in music with sparseness, barrenness and quietness. I wanted to signify empty space musically. Hence why the harsh noise is few and far between, and I think a little more effective because of all the sparseness it contrasts with".  Comparing the two albums, Metcalfe has said "Originally I was worried 'The Origin of My Depression' wasn't "Uboa" enough because of how restrained and sparse it is as a record."

She describes the writing process for My Depression as having "little conscious intentionality, it was mostly an intuitive process of writing. Nothing was planned out, and a lot of the songs were improvisations refined into compositions, usually after several attempts. “Detransitioning” took countless attempts to get right, whereas “An Angel of Great and Terrible Light” came out of nowhere."

Discography

Albums

Extended Plays and Other Releases

Awards and nominations

Music Victoria Awards
The Music Victoria Awards are an annual awards night celebrating Victorian music. They commenced in 2006.

! 
|-
|rowspan="2"| Music Victoria Awards of 2019
| Uboa (Xandra Metcalfe)
| Best Experimental/Avant-Garde Act
| 
|rowspan="2"| 
|-
| The Origin of My Depression
| Best Heavy Album
|

Notes

External links
 Bandcamp

Ambient music groups
Noise musical groups
Musical groups from Melbourne